Salisbury South is a suburb located in the City of Salisbury, Adelaide, South Australia. It is bounded by Frost Road, Main North Road, Kings Road and Cross Keys Road. It is predominantly industrial in character and includes factories for brandnames such as Bickford's and R. M. Williams.

References